is a Japanese given name used by either sex and is occasionally used as a surname.

Possible writings
Nagisa can be written using different kanji characters and can mean:
渚, "beach, strand"
汀, "water's edge/shore"
凪砂, "lull, sand"
The given name can also be written in hiragana or katakana.

People with the name
, Japanese actress and singer
, Japanese singer and actress
Nagisa Arakaki (新垣 渚; born 1980), Japanese professional baseball player
Nagisa Futami (二見 渚), Japanese voice actress
, Japanese field hockey player
, Japanese swimmer
Nagisa Katahira (片平 なぎさ; born 1959), Japanese television actress
Nagisa Nozaki (野崎 渚; born 1990), Japanese professional wrestler
Nagisa Oshima (大島 渚; born 1932), Japanese film director
Nagisa Sakurauchi (櫻内 渚; born 1989), Japanese football player
Nagisa Shibuya (渋谷 凪咲; born 1996), Japanese singer, member of NMB48

Characters
 Nagisa Aoi (渚砂), the main character in the Strawberry Panic! series
 Nagisa Furukawa (古河 渚), the main heroine in the Clannad series
 Nagisa Chiba (千葉 凪沙), a character in the Code Geass anime
 Nagisa Iwashiro (渚), a character in the Battle Arena Toshinden fighting game series
 Nagisa Akatsuki (暁 凪沙), a character in the anime series Strike the Blood
 Nagisa Sagan (目渚), a character of the manga and anime series Loveless
 Nagisa Misumi (美墨 なぎさ), a character in Futari wa Pretty Cure and its sequel.
 Nagisa Hazuki (葉月 渚), a character of the anime series Free!
 Nagisa Kanou (加納 渚), the main heroine in the Fight! Iczer One
 Nagisa Motomiya (本宮 凪沙), one of the main characters in AKB0048
 Nagisa Kisaragi (ナギサ・キサラギ), one of the main characters in Firestorm
 Nagisa Momoe (百江 なぎさ), a character in the anime series Puella Magi Madoka Magica
 Nagisa Shiota (潮田 渚), one of the main characters in the manga series Assassination Classroom
 Nagisa Shingetsu (新月 渚), a character from Danganronpa Another Episode: Ultra Despair Girls
 Nagisa Daimonji, a character in the anime series Cardfight!! Vanguard
 Nagisa, an Eevee named and owned by Suiren/Lana in the anime series Pokémon Sun and Moon
 Nagisa Kashiwagi (柏木 渚), a character in Kaguya-sama wa Kokurasetai

Surname 
 Azuya Nagisa, a character from Clamp School Detectives
 Kaworu Nagisa (渚 カヲル), one of the main characters in Neon Genesis Evangelion franchise
 Maria Nagisa, a character who replacing Miss America II from Battle Fever J
 Ouka Nagisa, a character in the video games Super Robot Taisen: Original Generation 2 and Super Robot Wars: Original Generations, as well as the animated adaptation Super Robot Wars Original Generation: The Inspector.

Other uses
NaGISA, an effort to catalog biodiversity of in-shore areas
Nagisa (harpist), a Persian harpist from the 7th century

References 

Japanese-language surnames
Japanese unisex given names